KEAR (610 kHz), is a non-commercial Christian AM radio station in San Francisco, California and is the flagship station of the reorganized Family Radio network and airs several Christian ministry broadcasts from noted teachers such as RC Sproul, Alistair Begg, Ken Ham, John F. MacArthur, Adriel Sanchez, Dennis Rainey, John Piper, & others as well as traditional and modern hymns & songs by Keith & Kristyn Getty, The Master's Chorale, Fernando Ortega, Chris Rice, Shane & Shane, Sovereign Grace Music, Sara Groves, & multiple other Christian and Gospel music artists.

KEAR's transmitter facilities are diplexed at the KVTO tower located in Berkeley, California although the station's programming is also broadcast on KEBR in Sacramento, California, whose signal is transmitted from radio repeaters for local markets across California, such as 90.9 MHz (K217BJ) in Banning. Until 2005, KEAR was broadcasting on 106.9 MHz FM.

History

610 AM KFRC

The frequency of 610 kHz had been home to the original KFRC for over eight decades, from September 24, 1924 until April 29, 2005. In the 1960s and 1970s, KFRC was a legendary Top 40 rock-music station in San Francisco, but on August 11, 1986, KFRC had changed to an Adult Standards format. On August 12, 1993, it began simulcasting its sister station KFRC-FM's Oldies format.

KEAR call letters

The call letters KEAR were first adopted in the Bay Area by an AM station at 1550 kHz in San Mateo—the former KSMO (now KZDG)—on January 1, 1952. The station, which signed on in 1947, was the first classical music station in San Francisco. When KEAR stopped broadcasting classical music in 1956—as the result of financial difficulties—many San Francisco classical music lovers needed to become early adopters and purchase recently introduced FM radios so they could listen to classical music broadcasts on KDFC or on KEAR's co-owned FM station, formerly KXKX; the KEAR call letters moved from AM to FM when the AM station was sold. Family Stations Inc. bought the station in 1959, and aired its first Family Radio broadcast on KEAR on February 4 of that year.

In September 1978, Family Stations Inc. sold its station at 97.3 to CBS (becoming KCBS-FM, and subsequently KLLC), and acquired KMPX (106.9 FM) from National Science Network, Inc. At this time, the KEAR call letters and Family Radio programming were transferred to the new frequency, where it broadcast for 27 years.

KEAR moves to 610 AM
In 2005, Family Stations acquired KFRC's AM frequency from Infinity Broadcasting.  Viacom, the parent company of Infinity Broadcasting, was in the process of acquiring television station KOVR in Stockton, California, and needed to sell the AM station to meet Federal Communications Commission ownership limitations. On April 29, 2005, 610 AM began simulcasting Family Radio programming. Shortly thereafter, Family Stations sold its 106.9 FM frequency to Infinity Broadcasting.

The Oakland Athletics baseball team, which had a contract with KFRC to carry its games, continued to broadcast on 610 AM through the end of the team's 2005 season. On October 17, 2005, after the season ended, the KEAR call letters were transferred to the AM station and 106.9 became KIFR, later to become, ironically, KFRC-FM.

Coincidentally, all three of the frequencies which formerly had the KEAR call letters are now assigned to Audacy (formerly Entercom), which acquired CBS Radio (the former Infinity Broadcasting) in 2017.

External links
FCC History Cards for KEAR
The History of KFRC
The First Days of KFRC
The History of KFRC, San Francisco and the Don Lee Networks

Family Radio stations
RKO General
EAR
Radio stations established in 1924
EAR
1924 establishments in California